"Moonlighting" is a song by Leo Sayer released in August 1975 as the first single from his third album Another Year. It became his fourth top-ten hit, peaking at number 2 on the UK Singles Chart and was certified silver by the British Phonographic Industry.

Lyrics
"Moonlighting" was written by Sayer and Frank Farrell and was co-produced by Sayer's manager Adam Faith and Russ Ballard.

It was inspired by a roadie with Sayer who fell in love with the daughter of a chief of police in the late 1960s. The chief of police was not pleased about this and would not agree for them to get married, so the couple decided to run off and elope to Gretna Green in Scotland, where this would be possible. However, they never made it to Gretna Green, as they were stopped by Carlisle police who had been made aware by Worthing police of the couple's intentions. For the song, Sayer wanted the story to end happily, represented with the lyrics "we're only ten miles to Gretna, they're three hundred behind".

Charts

Weekly charts

Year-end charts

Certifications

References

1975 singles
1975 songs
Leo Sayer songs
Songs written by Leo Sayer